Empress of the World is a young adult novel by Sara Ryan. It was published in 2001. Its sequel, The Rules for Hearts, was published in April 2007. It won the 2002 Oregon Book Award for Young Readers Literature.

Ryan summarizes the book conceptually as "Friendship, love, and the sometimes blurry lines between the two."

Empress of the World tells the story of Nicola, a teenage girl who attends a summer program for gifted children, where she falls in love with a girl named Battle.

External links
Empress of the World Information, from author's website
Empress of the World, book details from LibraryThing

References

2001 American novels
American LGBT novels
American young adult novels
Novels about friendship
Novels with lesbian themes
Lesbian teen fiction
LGBT-related young adult novels
2000s LGBT novels
Penguin Books books
2001 LGBT-related literary works